Chang Ming-che (6 May 1914 – 31 July 1998) was a Taiwanese academic.

References

1914 births
1998 deaths
Ministers of Science and Technology of the Republic of China
Academic staff of the National Tsing Hua University
Massachusetts Institute of Technology alumni
Educators from Hebei
Republic of China politicians from Hebei
Presidents of National Tsing Hua University